The abductor hallucis muscle is an intrinsic muscle of the foot. It participates in the abduction and flexion of the great toe.

Structure

The abductor hallucis muscle is located in the medial border of the foot and contributes to form the prominence that is observed on the region. It is inserted behind on the tuberosity of the calcaneus, the flexor retinaculum, and the plantar aponeurosis. Its muscle body, relatively thick behind, flattens as it goes forward. It ends in a common tendon with the medial head of the flexor hallucis brevis that inserts on the medial surface of the base of the first proximal phalanx and its related sesamoid bone. Its medial surface is superficial and covered with the muscle's fascia and the skin.

Nerve supply

Abductor hallucis is supplied by the medial plantar nerve. The nerves that supply it enter the muscle from its upper border.

Additional images

See also

 Intrinsic muscles of the foot
 Sole of the foot

References

External links
 
 PTCentral

Foot muscles
Muscles of the lower limb
Lower limb anatomy